Dance Academy is an Australian teen-oriented television drama produced by Werner Film Productions in association with the Australian Broadcasting Corporation and ZDF. Series one premiered on 31 May 2010, and series two began airing on 12 March 2012. Series three premiered on ABC3 on 8 July 2013 in Australia.

The television drama lasted 3 seasons with 65 episodes. A film sequel to the television series, Dance Academy: The Movie, was released by StudioCanal in Australian cinemas on 6 April 2017.

Plot
Dance Academy is narrated mainly from the perspective of Tara Webster (Xenia Goodwin), a newly accepted first year student at the National Academy of Dance in Sydney, which also doubles as a Year 10–12 high school for the dancers. Throughout the series, she learns to better her ballet technique, as well as learn contemporary ballet and hip-hop dance, while creating lifelong friendships and experiencing many hardships. In the first series, Tara soon befriends fellow students Kat (Alicia Banit) and Ethan Karamakov (Tim Pocock), Sammy Lieberman (Tom Green), Abigail Armstrong (Dena Kaplan) and Christian Reed (Jordan Rodrigues), as well as eventually getting to know her teacher Ms. Raine (Tara Morice).

Series Two sees Tara return to the academy for her second year with the hope of representing Australia in an international ballet competition, the Prix de Fonteyn. This series introduces new students Grace Whitney (Isabel Durant), Ben Tickle (Thomas Lacey), Ollie Lloyd (Keiynan Lonsdale), as well as teacher Saskia Duncan (Brooke Harman), and sees the characters react to an unexpected death.

Series Three follows the characters in their final year at the academy as they compete for a contract in the dance company. Grace and Tara obtain temporary spots in the corps de ballet, Kat stars in a dance film, Abigail and Ollie explore commercial dancing and singing, and the third years go on tour for Romeo and Juliet throughout regional Australia.

Episodes

Cast

Production
Dance Academy is produced by Joanna Werner's film company Werner Films Productions in association with the Australian Broadcasting Corporation, Screen Australia, Film Victoria, Film New South Wales and ZDF for Germany. , airing rights to Dance Academy have been sold to 180 territories, airing on every continent except Antarctica.

Casting and filming

Series one
Casting for series one began in early 2009 in Brisbane, Melbourne and Sydney. All cast members had to be skilled in drama and dancing and had to cope with Australia's best choreographers. Filming began on 13 July 2009 and wrapped up in early November. The series premiere was originally planned for a mid-2010 premiere on ABC3, however, like Dead Gorgeous, the premiere was pushed to ABC1 on 31 May 2010 and ABC3 on 6 June 2010. The first series premiered on Germany's ZDF on 26 September 2010.

Series two
Production of series two was officially green-lit by ABC and ZDF on 2 July 2010. Casting calls were issued on 14 September 2010, and principal photography in Sydney took place between 31 January and 4 August 2011. Series two premiered on ABC3 on 12 March 2012 and ran for 26 episodes, airing each week from Monday through Thursday, ending on 24 April.

Series three
Screen Australia approved investment funding for a third series of 13 episodes on 5 December 2011. Filming began 27 August 2012, ended filming 27 November 2012. On 5 June 2013, Alicia Banit and Thomas Lacey appeared on ABC3's Studio 3 to announce the series 3 premiere on 8 July 2013.

Release

Online streaming
The show is available on streaming sites, including Hulu.com and Netflix.com. Entire episodes of all three seasons are also available, for free, on the show's official YouTube channel, however it is not available in Australia.

DVD releases
The Australian Broadcasting Corporation has released all episodes from series one through three on DVD—with series one and two across four volumes and series three over two—as well as series collections and a complete series one to three compilation.

Awards

Books
ABC Books has released seven paperback novels, each based on a particular episode and from the perspective of a single character. The books are published by ABC Books and HarperCollins Australia.

Film: Dance Academy: The Movie

On 22 April 2015, a feature film adaption of Dance Academy was announced along with other feature film projects to have received funding from Screen Australia. The film is a sequel to the television series, set 18 months after the events of series three, and follows Tara's journey as she pursues her dream to become a ballerina star. Pre-production for the film, then titled Dance Academy: The Comeback, began on 17 April 2016. Shooting for the film began on 29 May 2016, and wrapped on 22 July. The official trailer for the film was released on 25 December 2016. The film, retitled Dance Academy: The Movie, was released by StudioCanal to Australian cinemas on 6 April 2017. It was released internationally on Netflix under the title Dance Academy: The Comeback.

Plot
20 year old Tara’s life is noticeably adrift. After the life changing injury (that occurred in the finale of the TV series), she finds herself underperforming in her role as a waitress for a catering company inside the Sydney Opera House, frequently being publicly berated by her demanding boss. Adding insult to injury, her frenemy and dance rival Abigail is now a soloist dancer for the Sydney Ballet Company with Tara’s work seeing her handing out canapes after Abigail’s highly acclaimed performances. 

Back at home, Christian asks Tara to move in with him to her delight. However, not all aspects of Tara’s life are running as smoothly. She longs to return to the world of competitive dance despite a 2 year hiatus, an impending court case means that she would be suing the very company she dreams of working for and her best friend Katrina Karamakov is now a successful children’s performer in New York while her close Ben is principal for the Austin Ballet.   

After bumping into Moira, the head of the Sydney Ballet Company and invited to audition, Tara drops the court case despite assurance from her lawyer (Matt Day) that she stands to win close to a million dollars in compensation thanks to compelling evidence in the form of a personal testimonial provided by Tara’s former ballet teacher Ms Raine. After Tara’s audition proves unsuccessful, she is convinced by Kat to take a trip to New York City and stay with her. Christian is less than thrilled with the news especially when Tara asserts that she will spend the trip auditioning for dance roles to fulfill her revenge fantasy of proving the company wrong. This leads to Christian calling Tara to end their relationship shortly after she arrives in New York. 

Despite a happy reunion with Kat on the set of her TV show, things go south after Tara runs into Ollie, a former 3rd year (when she was in 2nd year) who tells her to pull all the favours she has now before the city crushes her dreams like they have Ollie’s whose own dreams of “making it” as a dancer remain unrealised despite his best efforts and a string of unsuccessful auditions. Kat and Tara also have a falling out when Tara expresses her concerns about Kat’s apathy towards her own success and current boyfriend who she openly mocks. Tara leaves Kat’s penthouse and stays with Ms Raine and her partner Marcus at their ranch in Austin where Ben is also staying. 

There she discovers that despite his happy go-lucky social media presence, Ben is hiding a secret. His leukemia has returned and he is undergoing recovery from the chemotherapy with strict instructions to avoid dancing even though this is the only thing that makes him feel like this. In defiance, Ben and Tara secretly rehearse a symbolic dance for the upcoming Fringe Festival which they enter as contemporary choreographers under the amalgamation “Benstara”. 

After being accepted into the festival, Tara again encounters Moira who, after seeing her beautiful rendition of Orpheous in the Underworld, offers her a place in Corp of the Sydney Ballet Company as another dancer has pulled out due to injuries. Having achieved her dream, Tara finds life in the corp demanding and unfulfilling. She ultimately leaves a performance after receiving a call from a distraught Ollie, who has replaced Tara’s role in “Benstara” and as Ben’s carer, that Ben has collapsed and is in hospital. 

Realising that there is more to life than dance, Tara resigns from the company and reunites with Kat and Christian who has flown in from Australia to tell her that he misses her. Inspired by Tara’s rebellion, Abigail takes Tara’s original place in the fringe performance despite her active contract with the Sydney Ballet Company whilst Tara and Christian watch from the wings. 

Back in Sydney, the friends watch and participate in a high-energy performance by Christian’s dance students at the Samuel Lieberman Centre. Having realised her new ambition to become a choreographer, Tara maps out her plans for her next routine in the journal she receives from Christian confidently predicting, “this next part is going to be amazing”, presumably referring not only to the dance but their future together.

References

External links
  at the Australian Broadcasting Company
 Dance Academy on Hulu in the United States
 
 
 

Australian Broadcasting Corporation original programming
2010 Australian television series debuts
2013 Australian television series endings
Australian children's television series
2010s Australian drama television series
Dance television shows
English-language television shows
2010s teen drama television series
Television shows set in Sydney
Television series about ballet
Television series about teenagers
Australian children's drama films
StudioCanal films
Films scored by David Hirschfelder
Works about performing arts education